Alsópetény is a village and municipality in Nógrád County, Hungary.

References

Populated places in Nógrád County